S. Rukiah (also known as Siti Rukiah Kertapati; April 25, 1927 – June 7, 1996) was an Indonesian poet and novelist.

Biography
Siti Rukiah was born in Purwakarta, West Java on April 25, 1927. After her graduation, she pursued teaching in Purwakarta, before initiating her career into writing. She began by writing poems for magazines like "Age Wave", and moved on to write short stories, children's stories and novels. In 1948, she joined the literary magazine Poedjangga Baroe as its Purwakarta correspondent, and in 1950 she moved to Jakarta to become the journal's editorial secretary. Her first novel also appeared in 1950, entitled Kedjatuhan dan Hati (The Fall and the Heart). Though a lesser known classic, the novel strongly presents the dark side of the revolution touching the lives of peoples and their emotions.
 The novel precedes Elena Ferrante’s theme about being young and intellectual and belonging to the women’s category, the impact of social policy and feminism, political ideologies and reality, economic independence, and acceptance from family. The novel is a forceful rendition of a woman's struggle during the country's independence struggle as well as in the period post-independence. It stands as the only novel that explores the negative impact of war on personal relationship through the character of a middle-class woman who lived during the Indonesian National Revolution. Realizing its significance as a classic piece of prose by a woman writer before the 1970s, Rukiah's novel became one of the first five titles chosen by the Lontar Foundation for its new Modern Library of Indonesia series.

In 1951, she relocated to Bandung and became the editor of the children's magazine Paradise. In 1952, her collection of short stories and poems was published under the title Deficient, which won national literary prize. In the same year she started writing children's stories under her married name, "S. Rukiah Kertapati", and published continuously in this field until 1964. She also compiled an anthology of realistic fiction in the form of short stories with her lover and husband, Sidik Kertapati, titled The Love Love, along with another collection, Teragedi Humanity.

Though Rukiah never joined LEKRA, the cultural wing of the Indonesian Communist Party (PKI), she was chosen the member of LEKRA central leadership in 1959. Owing to this affiliation, her books were banned during the overthrow of President Sukarno and the forbidding of the Indonesian Communist Party (PKI) in 1965.
 As a result of the events of 1965, she suffered emotional trauma, which put a halt to her creative self.

Publications

References

1927 births
Indonesian women poets
Indonesian women novelists
Indonesian novelists
1996 deaths
20th-century Indonesian poets
20th-century Indonesian women writers
Members of the Lembaga Kebudajaan Rakjat
20th-century novelists
People from Purwakarta Regency